Chimerin 2 (beta-chimaerin) is a protein that in humans is encoded by the CHN2 gene.

This gene is a member of the chimerin family and encodes a protein with a phorbol-ester/diacylglycerol-type zinc finger, a Rho-GAP domain and an SH2 domain. This protein has GTPase-activating protein activity that is regulated by phospholipid binding and binding of diacylglycerol (DAG) induces translocation of the protein from the cytosol to the Golgi apparatus membrane. The protein plays a role in the proliferation and migration of smooth muscle cells. Decreased expression of this gene is associated with high-grade gliomas and breast tumors, and increased expression of this gene is associated with lymphomas. Mutations in this gene have been associated with schizophrenia in men. Alternate transcriptional splice variants, encoding different isoforms, have been characterized.

References

Further reading